Epichorista allogama is a species of moth of the family Tortricidae. It is found in New Zealand.

The wingspan is 14–15 mm for males and 16–17 mm for females. The forewings are dark fuscous, suffused with deep purple. There is a patch of ochreous-whitish irroration (speckling). The hindwings are dark fuscous.

References

Moths described in 1914
Epichorista
Moths of New Zealand